Canterbury is a region in the South Island of New Zealand. It contains numerous rural primary schools, several small town primary and secondary schools, and big-city schools in Christchurch.

Due to the large number of schools in Christchurch, they are listed separately at List of schools in Christchurch. Schools in the Waitaki District which are located in the Canterbury part of the district are listed at List of schools in Otago.

In New Zealand schools, students begin formal education in Year 1 at the age of five. Year 13 is the final year of secondary education. Years 14 and 15 refer to adult education facilities.

State schools are those fully funded by the government and at which no fees can be charged, although a donation is commonly requested. A state integrated school is a state school with a special character based on a religious or philosophical belief.

Kura Kaupapa Māori are Māori immersion schools  that are also state funded, but deliver their curriculum in the Māori language.  There are two of these schools in Christchurch: Te Kura Kaupapa Māori o Te Whānau Tahi in Spreydon (Decile 3), and Te Kura Kaupapa Māori o Waitaha in Woolston (Decile 1).

The decile indicates the socio-economic group that the school catchment area falls into. A rating of 1 indicates a poor area; a rating of 10 a well-off one. The decile ratings used here come from the Ministry of Education Te Kete Ipurangi website and from the decile change spreadsheet listed in the references. The deciles were last revised using information from the 2006 Census. The roll of each school changes frequently as students start school for the first time, move between schools, and graduate. The rolls given here are those provided by the Ministry of Education, based on figures from  The Ministry of Education institution number, given in the last column, links to the Education Counts page for each school.

Kaikoura District
The Kaikoura district is the northernmost district of the Canterbury region, and is home to  people. The district seat of Kaikōura (pop. ) is the only significant urban area.

Former schools
Woodbank School, Clarence – closed in December 2013 due to declining roll numbers
Lynton Downs School – closed April 2017.

Hurunui District

Waimakariri District

Former schools
Okuku School, closed in 1987, students moved to Loburn School.
Waikuku School, state full primary at Waikuku, relocated to Pegasus Town in April–May 2014 and renamed Pegasus Bay School.

Christchurch City

Selwyn District

Ashburton District
The Ashburton District covers the area between the Rakaia River and the Rangitata River, and is home to  people. Ashburton (pop. ) is the district seat and by far the largest town, with significant other towns including Methven (pop. c.1350) and Rakaia (pop. c. 1000).

Former schools
 Lowcliffe School - full primary school, closed October 2011 due to declining roll numbers.
 Pendarves School - years 1–6, closed in the late 20th century due to declining roll numbers. Pendarves School children were moved to Chertsey School when it closed.

Timaru District

Mackenzie District

Former schools
Twizel Primary School, a contributing primary (Year 1–6) school, and Twizel High School, a Year 7–13 secondary school. The schools opened in Twizel in 1970 and 1971 respectively, primarily to serve the children of workers building the Upper Waitaki hydroelectric scheme. After the scheme was completed in 1985 and the workers moved on, the two separate schools were no longer needed, and in 1986 were merged on the High School site to form Twizel Area School.

Waimate District

Former schools
 Morven School - full primary school, closed 2016 due to declining roll numbers.
 Waihaorunga School - full primary school, closed 2010 due to declining roll numbers.

Notes

References
Te Kete Ipurangi Ministry of Education website
ERO school and early childhood education reports Education Review Office
Decile change 2007 to 2008 for state & state integrated schools

Canterbury